Electric (fully as Paul Rodgers Electric according to Paul Rodgers official site) is a studio album by Paul Rodgers of Free and Bad Company fame. It was recorded in 1999 at Lartington Hall Studios near Barnard Castle in the North East of England. Electric was released in 2000 (the Japanese version of 1999 has a bonus track).

Track listing
All songs written and produced by Paul Rodgers.
"Deep Blue" (2:33)
"Walking Tall" (3:34)
"Find a Way" (5:37)
"China Blue" (3:01)
"Love Rains" (3:18)
"Over You" (6:29)
"Drifters" (4:19)
"Freedom" (3:53)
"Jasmine Flower" (3:59)
"Conquistadora" (4:55)

Personnel
Paul Rodgers - guitar, piano, lead vocals, producer, mixing 
Geoff Whitehorn - guitar
Jim Copley - drums
Jaz Lochrie - bass guitar
Tom Keenlyside - flute
Saffron Henderson - backing vocals 
Tania Hancheroff - backing vocals
Catherine St. Germain - backing vocals
Cynthia Kereluk - backing vocals 
Technical
Zach Blackstone - assistant engineer
Dean Maher - assistant engineer
Stephen Croxford - coordination

Charts

Singles

Paul Rodgers albums
2000 albums